The Ruth Paine Home at 2515 W. 5th Street in Irving, Texas, United States, is the location where Lee Harvey Oswald spent the night before he assassinated United States President John F. Kennedy on November 22, 1963, at Dealey Plaza. It was from the house's garage that he removed the rifle he used for the assassination, which he had previously concealed there.

The house was placed on the National Register of Historic Places on November 16, 2014.

History
Located in the Dallas suburb of Irving, the Paine home was a key location in the John F. Kennedy assassination saga of 1963. The house, owned at the time by Michael and Ruth Paine, served as a temporary residence for Marina Oswald and her children. The Paines were separated and living apart, so Ruth had offered her home to Marina.

Marina's husband, Lee Harvey Oswald, was living at a rooming house at 1026 N. Beckley in Dallas to be near his newly acquired job at the Texas School Book Depository in Downtown Dallas. Oswald visited Marina and the children customarily on Fridays and spent the weekend at the Paine home, then returned again to Dallas for work on Monday.

After his shift on Thursday, November 21, 1963, Oswald surprised co-worker Buell Wesley Frazier in asking for a ride back to Irving on Thursday instead of the following day. Frazier, a nearby neighbor of the Paines, also worked at the Texas School Book Depository, and he and Oswald commuted together daily to Downtown Dallas. Lee stated that Marina had made him some new curtains for his apartment and he wanted to retrieve them.

On the morning of November 22, 1963, Oswald retrieved his rifle from the garage, where it was concealed in a blanket on the garage floor. Leaving early before anyone was awake, and leaving cash and his wedding ring on a bedside table, Oswald reportedly then wrapped the rifle in some bulk brown wrapping paper and proceeded a half block to the home where Frazier stayed. He placed the package in the back seat and began the commute to the Texas School Book Depository. Hours later, Oswald assassinated President John F. Kennedy as his presidential motorcade passed directly in front of the building.

Purchase by City of Irving and museum
In 2009, the City of Irving purchased the property and began plans to restore the home. In an effort to return the home to its 1963 appearance, the city spent an estimated $100,000. Restoration began in 2011, and the Ruth Paine Home was opened as a museum on November 6, 2013.

See also

National Register of Historic Places listings in Dallas County, Texas

References

External links

Ruth Paine Home - museum website
Sixth Floor Museum
City of Irving Press Release

Buildings and structures associated with the assassination of John F. Kennedy
Houses on the National Register of Historic Places in Texas
National Register of Historic Places in Dallas County, Texas
Museums in Dallas County, Texas
Historic house museums in Texas
Buildings and structures in Irving, Texas
Houses in Dallas County, Texas